Television is a studio album by New Orleans R&B artist Dr. John.

Track listing
All tracks composed by Mac Rebennack; except where indicated
 "Television" – 4:36
 "Lissen" – 4:29
 "Limbo" – 4:30
 "Witchy Red" – 4:16
 "Shadows" (Mac Rebennack, Doc Pomus) – 4:03
 "Shut D Fonk Up" (Mac Rebennack, Anthony Kiedis) – 5:10
 "Thank You (Falletin Me Be Mice Elf Again)" (Sylvester Stewart) – 4:03
 "Spaceship Relationship" – 4:05
 "Hold It" - 3:56
 "Money (That's What I Want)" (Berry Gordy, Janie Bradford) – 3:23
 "U Lie 2 Much" – 4:30
 "Same Day Service" - 5:00

Personnel
Dr. John - vocals, piano, organ, keyboards, Korguitar
Hugh McCracken - guitar, dobro, bass harmonica, S900 drum
Georg Wadenius - guitar
David Barad - bass, background vocals
Fred Staehle - drums, winger tree
Errol "Crusher" Bennett - percussion, congas
Alvin "Red" Tyler - tenor saxophone
Ronnie Cuber - baritone saxophone, tenor saxophone, horn arrangements
Charles Miller - trumpet, whistles, horn arrangement ("Shut D Fonk Up")
Randy Brecker - trumpet
Birch Johnson - trombone
David "Fathead" Newman - flute, tenor saxophone solo w/ams ("Lissen"), alto saxophone solo ("Money (That's What I Want)", "U Lie 2 Much")
Anthony Kiedis - vocals ("Shut D Fonk Up")
James Genus - bass ("Thank You (Falletin Me Be Mice Elf Again)", "Money (That's What I Want)")
Sonny Emory - drums ("Thank You (Falletin Me Be Mice Elf Again)", "Money (That's What I Want)")
Lani Groves, Rachelle Cappelli, Katrice Barnes, Diva Gray, Vaneese Thomas, Curtis King - backing vocals

References

1994 albums
Dr. John albums
GRP Records albums